Cryovac may refer to:
 Cryovac (brand), the food packaging division of Sealed Air
 Cryovacking, a cooking technique that uses airtight plastic bags combined with long cook times